Armells is a ghost town in Fergus County, in the U.S. state of Montana.

History
A post office called Armells was established in 1890, and remained in operation until it was discontinued in 1937. The community took its name from nearby Armells Creek.

References

Geography of Fergus County, Montana
Ghost towns in Montana